Gulko is a gender-neutral Ukrainian surname. Notable people with the surname include:

Boris Gulko (born 1947), Russian-American chess player
Mikhail Gulko (born 1931), Soviet singer

Ukrainian-language surnames